Daniel R. Mandelker is the Howard A. Stamper Professor of Law at Washington University School of Law. His scholarship has been heavily cited in the fields of land use law, state and local government law, and environmental law.

Educational Background
He received his B.A. in 1947 and his LL.B. in 1949 from the University of Wisconsin. He went on to receive his J.S.D. in 1956 from Yale University.

Selected publications
"Planning and Control of Land Development," (with J. Payne, P. Salsich & N. Stroud) (7th ed. 2007).
"Land Use Law" (comprehensive treatise in this field).
"Property Law and the Public Interest," (with G. Hylton, D. Callies & P. Franzese (3d ed. 2007) (modern property law casebook).
"State and Local Government in a Federal System" (with D. Netsch, P. Salsich, J. Wegner, S. Stevenson & J. Griffith) (6th ed. 2006) (casebook on state and local government).
"NEPA Law and Litigation" (2d ed. 1992 & Supp. 2007).

See also
Land Use
Local government in the United States

References

External links
Prof. Mandelker's Land Use Law blog
Prof. Mandelker's State and Local Government blog
Prof. Mandelker's faculty profile
Prof. Mandelker's publications

Washington University in St. Louis faculty
University of Wisconsin Law School alumni
Living people
Year of birth missing (living people)
Yale Law School alumni